Spike: Old Times is a comic based on the Angel television series.

Story description

Spike struggles to protect a man from Halfrek, a vengeance demon who has wronged Spike in the past; she in fact had been the object of his unrequited crush.

Writing and artwork

Cultural references
Boris Karloff: William is given a last name in this comic: Pratt. William Henry Pratt is the birth name of legendary actor Boris Karloff, who built his career on horror movies.

Continuity

This story explains why Spike and Halfrek appear to recognize each other in "Older and Far Away". In the TV series, both Halfrek and Cecily are played by the same actress, Kali Rocha.
A number of fans mistakenly assume this takes place in Angel season 5 because Spike appears in Los Angeles, and therefore do not believe it can fit into the continuity of the Buffyverse. Writer Peter David posted in the Newsarama forums regarding this issue:

Canonical issues

Angel comics such as this one are not usually considered by fans as canonical. Some fans consider them stories from the imaginations of authors and artists, while other fans consider them as taking place in an alternative fictional reality. However unlike fan fiction, overviews summarizing their story, written early in the writing process, were "approved" by both Fox and Joss Whedon (or his office), and the books were therefore later published as officially Buffy merchandise.

References

External links
Whedonesque.com - Whedonesquers discuss the continuity placement of the comic

Angel (1999 TV series) comics
Comics by Peter David
One-shot comic titles